Sharr Htut Eaindra (Burmese: သျှားထွဋ်အိန္ဒြာ, pronounced [ʃá tʰʊʔ ʔèiɴdɹà]; born 21 March 1994) is a Burmese model and beauty pageant titleholder who won the Miss Universe Myanmar 2014 and represented Myanmar at Miss Universe 2014.

Pageantry

Miss Mega Expo 2013
Before competing at Miss Universe Myanmar 2014, she was placed the 2nd Runner-up at Mega Expo 2013, and represented Myanmar at 2013 Southeast Asian Games in the Burmese traditional costume.

Miss Myanmar 2014
She was crowned Miss Universe Myanmar 2014 on 26 July 2014. She was crowned together with runners-up, Yoon Mhi Mhi Kyaw and Shwe Sin Ko Ko.

Miss Universe 2014
Sharr competed at Miss Universe 2014 but was unplaced.

References

External links
Official Miss Myanmar website

1994 births
Living people
Burmese beauty pageant winners
Burmese female models
Miss Universe 2014 contestants
Miss Universe Myanmar winners